"The Sound of Silence" is the ninth episode, serving as a mid-season premiere of the twelfth season of the American medical drama  television series Grey's Anatomy, and is the 254th overall episode, which aired on ABC on February 11, 2016. The episode was written by Stacy McKee and directed by Denzel Washington. On initial release, the episode was watched by 8.28 million viewers and received praise for Washington's direction, Ellen Pompeo's performance, and McKee’s writing.

Grey's Anatomy centers around a group of physicians struggling to balance their professional lives with their personal lives. "The Sound of Silence" revolves around Meredith Grey who is brutally attacked by a patient, and sustains numerous injuries. The doctors of Grey Sloan Memorial rush to help her recover from the injuries and remain by her side in the harrowing aftermath. Further storylines include the aftermath of Alex Karev proposing to his girlfriend Jo Wilson and Jackson Avery serving divorce papers to his wife April Kepner.

Plot
"The Sound of Silence" opens with Dr. Meredith Grey (Ellen Pompeo) teaching her anatomy class. The episode jumps back to Meredith, Maggie, and Alex as they are carpooling to work, stuck in a traffic jam that turns out to be the result of a road accident. Upon arrival at the hospital, the doctors get to work treating the people who were injured in the accident. Meredith is working with Dr. Penny Blake (Samantha Sloyan) and Dr. Ben Warren (Jason George) on Lou, a patient who needs a neurological consult. Ben asks Dr. Amelia Shepherd (Caterina Scorsone), but she chooses to assist Dr. Owen Hunt (Kevin McKidd) instead, because of her previous fight with Meredith. Meanwhile, Meredith is left alone with the patient. The patient becomes violent as the result of post-seizure hyper-aggression and assaults Meredith, leaving her battered and barely conscious on the floor.

Penny finds Meredith and calls for help. The doctors rush to save Meredith's life, in the face of her injuries. As Dr. Richard Webber     (James Pickens Jr.), Dr. April Kepner (Sarah Drew), Dr. Callie Torres (Sara Ramirez), Owen, Dr. Maggie Pierce (Kelly McCreary), Ben, Dr. Jackson Avery (Jesse Williams) and Dr. Alex Karev (Justin Chambers) address the injuries, Meredith realizes she is unable to speak. They soon discover that she's lost her hearing as a result of the beating she endured. The episode then draws into silence as it is shown from Meredith's perspective, who is unable to hear, or speak. Her jaw is wired shut and she relies on her other senses to interpret the situation.

Alex visits Meredith during her recovery and attempts to cheer her up. Alex realizes Meredith’s hearing has returned after she laughs at one of his jokes. Later Dr. Miranda Bailey (Chandra Wilson) informs Meredith that Lou underwent surgery and was discharged. He's asked to see her to apologize, but Meredith refuses. Dr. Arizona Robbins (Jessica Capshaw) helps her prepare for a visit with her children. On arriving they are terrified when they see their mother in that condition and leave. Meredith has a panic attack, and Penny steps up to help, removing the wires holding her jaw shut. Jackson reprimands Penny for jeopardizing the healing process.

Amelia visits Meredith to apologize for her prior behavior and discuss her sobriety. Amelia confides in Meredith that she is scared to lose her, but Meredith responds that she is not ready to forgive her. Webber takes Meredith out for some fresh air, and gives her a talk about the power of forgiveness. He encourages her to forgive Amelia, Penny, Derek, and most importantly herself. She agrees to meet Lou. He introduces his wife and two daughters and then offers a sincere apology for what happened. Meredith, still unable to speak, takes his hand as a way of conveying her forgiveness.

After Meredith finally heals from her injuries and is discharged from the hospital, Alex helps her get settled back at home. She thanks him for his support, but points out that Dr. Jo Wilson (Camilla Luddington) loves him and needs him more than she does. In the final scenes, Meredith reunites with her kids.

Production

Running for approximately 43 minutes, the episode was written by Stacy McKee and directed by Denzel Washington. The episode featured the songs "My Girl", "I Surrender". In October 2015, it was announced by TVLine that two-time Academy Award-winner Washington was to direct the ninth episode of the season, which would be Washington's first time at directing television. He had previously directed the films Antwone Fisher and The Great Debaters . The table read for this episode took place on October 14, 2015 and shooting began on October 20. Before the release of the episode, a video was leaked from the set where Washington could be seen passing behind Chandra Wilson, as she pushes Pompeo around in a wheelchair, wearing full arm and leg casts. The video substantiated Washington’s involvement with the show and speculated Meredith’s injuries.

During the winter hiatus, Lesley Goldberg of The Hollywood Reporter confirmed Giacomo Gianniotti’s promotion to series regular over the winter hiatus. He had first appeared as Dr. Andrew DeLuca towards the end of Season 11 as a part of the new set of interns at the hospital.

The episode was heavily advertised and hyped by the ABC network before its release. In the preview of the show's return, Meredith is suffering from a long list of wounds, ranging from bruising on both her left chest and left knee to collapsed veins. In a sneak-peek clip from the episode, a patient is seen attacking Meredith, but it wasn't disclosed why the patient went after the Grey Sloan surgeon. The Daily Beast wrote, "Footage of Ellen Pompeo's Dr. Meredith Grey being beat up by a patient and left for dead on a hospital room floor has been promoted with the admirable aggression of, well, a network promoting an event episode. There's a cheapness to stunt TV, sure. But there's also a crass beauty to it."

Pompeo spoke with Entertainment Weekly about the episode and said, “It’s for sure the [best] thing I’ve ever done on the show." On working with Washington she said, "We’ve never had anybody of his caliber come and direct our show ever. His charisma, he changes the energy in the room completely. Everybody is just at the top of their game. [He’s] amazing. Let’s just say I’m a huge fan. It’s a total dream come true.” In an interview with Entertainment Weekly, executive producer Shonda Rhimes called the episode “extraordinary and very, very powerful,” noting that by focusing on the show's protagonist, it “puts us on a path for the beginning of the second half of the season".

Reception

Ratings
"The Sound of Silence" was originally broadcast on February 11, 2016 on American Broadcasting Company (ABC) in the United States. It served as the mid-season premiere for the twelfth season of the show. On its initial release the episode was watched by a total of 8.28 million viewers and scored a 2.4/8 in the key 18-49 demographic in the Nielsen ratings, which was a decrease from the previous episode "Things We Lost in the Fire" watched by 8.50 million viewers and received a 2.5/8 ratings/share The episode was ranked 17th in overall viewership rank and 6th in 18-49 demographic. The episode was the third-most watched drama of the night.

Critical reception

The episode received widespread critical acclaim, with critics highlighting Washington's direction, Ellen Pompeo's performance and Stacy McKee's writing.

TV Line gave Pompeo's performance the most praise, called it "visceral" and wrote, "If a picture really says a thousand words, this review is superfluous: Any image we publish of Pompeo’s stricken face from this week’s Grey’s will tell you all you need to know about her." Praising McKee the site called  the episode a "stunner". The site added, "We long ago gave up predicting what the Emmy Awards will do. But we will still say that, if there’s any justice, Pompeo’s transcendent work ought to get the leading lady at very least the nomination for which she is so long overdue."

Maggie Fremont of Vulture described Pompeo as giving the same kind of "powerhouse performance" seen in all the time "Shonda continues to throw horrible situations at Meredith". Gwen Inhat of The A.V. Club praising both Pompeo and Washington called them the, "saving grace" from being a typical martyr-Meredith episode. She added that Washington, "hit it out of the park", and called Pompeo, the key player saying that, "Told only from her perspective, it’s a powerhouse episode for her." Janalen Samson of BuddyTV highlighted Pompeo and deemed her as "excellent", while calling the episode a "showcase for her".

Allanah Faherty of Moviepilot called the episode an "emotional roller coaster" and added that it was "the perfect return to the series". She also lauded Pompeo's performance saying, "Pompeo is an absolute pro at pulling at our heart strings."
Ashley Bissette Sumerel  of TV Fanatic rated the episode 4/5 and praised the character development of Grey, "it still stands as a unique story that allows Meredith's character to continue to develop." She added that episode as a stand-alone, "was really phenomenal" and that the ten minutes of silence from the episode blew her mind. She praised Pompeo saying, "Please give Ellen Pompeo an Emmy!" Spoiler TV also lauded the episode calling it "a worthy and effective mid season opener", praising Pompeo's "frighteningly realistic job", Justin Chambers's "most sensitive performance", and adding that McKee was at the "writing helm".

Ariana Bacle also praised the episode when she wrote in Entertainment Weekly labeling it as "a damn good hour". She added that Meredith, "has gone through so much that she’s earned an entire hour of TV completely focused on just her." Furthermore, the site praised Washington noting the portion of the episode, that goes on in complete silence as seen through Meredith’s point of view, calling it "especially powerful because of the lack of sound". Lauren Hoffman from Cosmopolitan lauded the episode for its "amazingly effective storytelling" and enjoyed the chemistry between Meredith and Alex. She further wrote that, "if nothing else, Grey's reminds us that there's no upper limit to the amount of suffering a single person can go through, so just grab your people and get ready to roll with it." Praising Washington she noted that, "Denzel and Grey's despite being disparate, could bring each other to new creative heights."

References

External links
 

Grey's Anatomy (season 12) episodes
2016 American television episodes